Cefnddwysarn is a small village in Gwynedd, Wales.

It is located on the A494 road approximately 3 miles east of the town of Bala and 8 miles west of Corwen. The village is situated within the traditional county of Merionethshire, and the community of Llandderfel.

External links 

www.geograph.co.uk : photos of Cefnddwysarn and surrounding area

Villages in Gwynedd